Janis Jan del Carmen Meneses Palma (born 4 July 1989) is a Chilean Social Worker who was elected as a member of the Chilean Constitutional Convention.

References

External links
 
 BCN Profile

1989 births
Living people
21st-century Chilean politicians
Members of the Chilean Constitutional Convention
Pontifical Catholic University of Valparaíso alumni
21st-century Chilean women politicians